The Union School is a historic school building in a rural setting of Ozark-St. Francis National Forest in Johnson County, Arkansas.  It is a -story wood-frame structure, with a gabled roof, weatherboard siding, and a stone foundation.  A central cross-gabled section rises to provide additional classroom space in the attic level.  The school was built by local craftsmen in 1928–29, replacing a previous structure which had been destroyed by fire.  The building has historically served the surrounding rural community as a community center, Masonic lodge, church, and school.

The building was listed on the National Register of Historic Places in 2011.

See also
National Register of Historic Places listings in Johnson County, Arkansas

References

School buildings on the National Register of Historic Places in Arkansas
Buildings and structures in Johnson County, Arkansas
National Register of Historic Places in Johnson County, Arkansas
Ozark–St. Francis National Forest